The Netherlands competed at the 2011 World Championships in Athletics from August 27 to September 4 in Daegu, South Korea.

Team selection

A team of 20 athletes was
announced to represent the country
in the event.
The team will be led by top sprinter Churandy Martina, fourth in the 2008
Olympic Games 100m, who had to find a new home because of the dissolution of
the Netherlands Antilles, and the refusal by the IOC to allow membership of
Curaçao due to 1995 decision that membership is only open to sovereign
countries (see here).

The following athletes appeared on the preliminary Entry List, but not on the Official Start List of the specific event, resulting in a total number of 17 competitors:

Results

Men

Decathlon

Women

Heptathlon

References

External links
Official local organising committee website
Official IAAF competition website

Nations at the 2011 World Championships in Athletics
World Championships in Athletics
Netherlands at the World Championships in Athletics